The Belgian Air Component is the air arm of the Belgian Armed Forces, and until January 2002 it was officially known as the Belgian Air Force. The Belgian military aviation was founded in 1909 and is one of the world's oldest air services.

The commander is Major General Thierry Dupont, appointed on 17 September 2020.

History

Foundation and early years
The Belgian military aviation was founded in 1909 as a branch of the Belgian Army, carrying the name . King Albert's interest in the military use of aircraft was the main impetus for its formation. Coincidentally, in the civil aviation sector, Baron Pierre de Caters earned the first civil pilot's brevet that same year. De Caters would promptly establish an aviation school. At approximately the same time, the War Ministry followed the French military's example and had pilots earn a civil pilot's brevet before their military one.

In 1910, three Belgian lieutenants earned their pilot's brevets at the school, paying their own fees. Two of the artillery lieutenants were Baudouin Montens d'Oosterwyck, who earned Brevet No. 19 on 30 September, and Alfred Sarteel, granted No. 23 on 10 November. The third lieutenant, Georges Nelis, was the new force's first aviation candidate, gaining Brevet No. 28 on 21 December. An aircraft was personally purchased for him.

In spring of 1911, the new air force established its military aviation school with five pilots, two mechanics, and a woodworker. It received its first aircraft via Baron Caters, who gave the aircraft to King Albert, who in turn presented it to the school.

On 12 September 1912, pilot Lieutenant Nelis and observer  Stellingwerff were the first Europeans to fire a machine gun from an aircraft; while Nelis brought the aircraft low, Stellingwerff put some bullets through a sheet staked out on the ground. They were disciplined for their efforts. Nelis then accompanied Capitaine Commandant Émile Mathieu to England during November 1913 to demonstrate aerial use of the Lewis machine gun at Hendon and Aldershot; as a result, the British adopted the Lewis, although the Belgians did not. Belgium entered World War I with aircraft tasked solely for reconnaissance missions.

World War I

A truck was assigned to each squadron, along with a fifth truck serving as a mobile workshop. Each squadron had a commander, five pilots, and six observers, with all officers seconded from parent units. As a result, most of the new aviators were from the Engineers and Artillery components of the Belgian armed forces. As the war began, a fifth squadron was created, staffed with civilian pilots called to the colors and equipped with Bleriots.

 Henri Crombez flew one of the first war patrols, in a Deperdussin racer on 4 August 1914 above Liège. Adjutant Behaeghe was the first to engage an enemy, a few days later. On 26 September, the Belgian air crew of  de Petrowski and Sergeant Benselin mortally wounded a German pilot with a rifle bullet and forced his Taube to land at Sint-Agatha-Berchem; if they had submitted a claim for this victory, its approval would have marked history's first air-to-air combat victory.

On 3 January 1915, two machine guns supplied by British were fitted to two Belgian aircraft, making a dual effort against the foe possible; these were Belgium's first dedicated fighter planes. In February, thirteen of the Belgian airmen flew 28 offensive patrols; their first dogfight was fought on the 26th, with ten Albatroses against three Belgian Farmans. On 26 March,  Boschmans sent a German two-seater into a steep dive when he seemed to hit the pilot; the German was not seen to either crash or land. This was the Belgian aviators' first victory claim.

In April, Lieutenant Fernand Jacquet mounted a machine gun on his pusher aircraft and sought out the enemy. On the 17th, he and his observer (Lieutenant Henri Vindevoghel) scored Belgium's first confirmed aerial victory, sending an Albatros reconnaissance aircraft down in flames over Roeselare. Apparently at about the same time, Adjutant José Orta and  Louis de Burlet were the first to attack an enemy observation balloon when they dropped three small bombs on a gasbag over Houthulst, however they either did not hit, or failed to explode.

On 18 January 1916, the decision was made to form a dedicated fighter squadron. It consisted of newly supplied Nieuport 10s and one obsolete Farman two-seater. The new unit was the first to mount an offensive formation for the new air force; on 15 February 1917, they flew an offensive patrol of seven. By this time, the AMB had grown to 44 aircraft, including 21 fighters. At this point, individual aircraft bore personal markings affixed by their pilots, but no unit designations.

In the summer of 1917, the AMB was allotted an active role in Allied aviation operations at the beginning of the Third Battle of Ypres. There was a sorting out of pilots into fighter or reconnaissance roles. Not all fighter pilots went into the new fighter units; as of 1 May, 22 remained with reconnaissance units to fly escort missions. The King insisted that Jacquet be given the command of the Group. The newly organized fighter wing contained the two fighter escadrilles; however,  became , and  became . The  was founded on 28 May to join them. By the start of the Allies final offensive in September 1918, the AMB was incorporated in the Allied aviation effort, and could send 40-plus aircraft into the air at one time. In its short span of service, the Groupe fought over 700 aerial combats and was credited with 71 confirmed and 50 probable victories.

Aircraft procurement difficulties
In June 1916 the nascent air force had received newer aircraft from the French in both single and double-seat versions of the Nieuport 10. The Belgians would continue to upgrade their aircraft throughout the war, though through their dependence on French manufacturers they became the stepchildren of the Allied effort from 1916 onwards. The introduction dates of various types, compared to the date of their acquisition by the Belgians, tells the tale. The Belgians got Nieuport 16s at the end of 1916. The Nieuport 17 came into service with the French as early as June 1916, but the Belgians received so few that in June 1917 they were still operating all their earlier Nieuports. They then contracted for newer Nieuport 23s, which were basically up-engined Nieuport 17s. Spad VIIs had entered French service on 2 September 1916; the Belgians first received them almost an entire year later, with the first one on board on 22 August 1917. In September 1917, Belgium had the Hanriot HD.1 supplied to it the year after it was introduced. Spad XIIIs also came on line that month, but would not show up in Belgian inventory until the next year. Sopwith Camels first went into service in May 1917 and the AMB received its first one on 29 November 1917.

The AMB did make one attempt to design and build its own aircraft. However the Ponnier M1 was not good enough for production, and the ten or so manufactured ended up with clipped wings as powered "Penguin" rollers for training rookie pilots.

Operational summary
One of its flying ace pilots, Willy Coppens, became the top ranking balloon buster of World War I, as well as one of the war's top aces. Four other pilots from the tiny force also became aces with it: Andre de Meulemeester, Edmond Thieffry, Jan Olieslagers, and Fernand Jacquet.

The fledgling air force was entrusted with flying both King Albert and Queen Elizabeth over the battle front at times.

Between the world wars
During the interwar period, the Belgian Army Air Force flew the Breguet 19. Some efforts were made to acquire aircraft from local production, such as those by Stampe et Vertongen and Renard. They also evaluated native designs like the ACAZ C.2 and LACAB GR.8, none of which entered mass production however.

World War II

At the start of World War II, the Army Air Force had three active Air Force Regiments. Aircraft which were used by those regiments were the Renard R-31 and R-32, the Fiat CR.42 Falco, the Hawker Hurricane, the Gloster Gladiator, the Fairey Fox, and the Fairey Battle. These were massacred by the much superior German Luftwaffe in the German invasion of May 1940. However, the acquired licences could not be used until May 1940 and the aircraft produced in the USA were eventually delivered to France and to the United Kingdom.

After the surrender of Belgium on 28 May 1940, a very small Belgian Air Force in exile was created in Great Britain as the Belgian section of the Royal Air Force Volunteer Reserve. This small force was active within the British Royal Air Force, and its squadrons were equipped with the Supermarine Spitfire and Hawker Typhoon.

The Cold War

On 15 October 1946, the Belgian military aviation was turned into an autonomous force, independent of the Belgian Army. From September 1953 to 1960, the Advanced Pilots' School operated Harvards from the Kamina military base in the Belgian Congo. Seemingly about 60 Harvards were at the base.

Post-Cold War reforms

At the beginning of the 1990s, the end of the Cold War caused the Belgian government to restructure the Belgian Armed Forces in order to cope with the changed threats. The Belgian Air Force was hit hard and saw its strength more than halved with the disbanding of the 3rd Tactical Wing in Bierset (1994); the disbanding of the 1st Fighter Wing in Beauvechain; the 9th Training Wing in Sint-Truiden Air Base; and the Elementary Flying School in Goetsenhoven (1996).

In 2002, the Belgian government decided to emulate Canada and impose a "single structure" on its armed forces in which the independent Belgian Air Force ceased to exist. The Belgian Air Component (COMOPSAIR being the HQ) consists of the 2nd Tactical Wing in Florennes Air Base and the 10th Tactical Wing in Kleine Brogel Air Base, both flying F-16s in four squadrons. Out of the 160 F-16s originally bought by Belgium, only 105 were upgraded; with further reductions to 72 aircraft in 2005; and planned to 60 by 2012. The 1st Wing at Beauvechain Air Base is assigned for the training of pilots, using the piston-powered Aermacchi SF.260 for elementary training, and the Alpha Jet for advanced training. Advanced combat training is done on F-16's at Kleine Brogel. COMOPSAIR still operates the Lockheed C-130 Hercules in the 15th Air Transport Wing based at Melsbroek Air Base, planning to replace them by seven Airbus A400M transport aircraft. VIPs are transported with Embraer 135/145 jets, Dassault 20/900, and the Airbus A321. The Sea King SAR helicopters were phased out in March 2019 after more than 40 years of service and replaced by NH-90s (4 NFH + 4 TTH). The Alouette III helicopters flown for the Belgian Navy in a utility-role was phased out in 2021.

In 2004, as part of the unified structure, the Army Aviation units of the Wing Heli were transferred to the COMOPSAIR. These contain the Agusta A109 attack helicopter, and the Alouette II training and recce helicopter.
In 2005, the Belgian Alpha Jets moved to Cazaux in France to continue the Initial Operational Training, while the Advanced Jet Training was done on French Alpha Jets at Tours. As from 2013 both Advanced Jet Training as well as Initial Operational Training are completed in Cazaux in France.
Within the framework of its commitments within the North Atlantic Treaty Organization, NATO, Belgium has assigned its 72 F-16s to NATO purposes. Two squadrons with a total of 16 aircraft have been designated for use by the Rapid Reaction Forces.
In February 2008, Defense Minister Pieter De Crem announced that due to increasing problems and poor serviceability, the two A310s were to be replaced as soon as possible by two aircraft in the same class. An Airbus A330 was dry-leased to take their place till March 2014 where it was replaced by an Airbus A321.
On September 1, 2010, the Wing Heli in Bierset was disbanded and the Agusta A109 helicopters moved to Beauvechain Air Base to become 1st Wing. The SF260 squadrons became part of the Basic Flying Training School.
On May 24, 2011, it was reported that the two retired Airbus A310 aircraft have been sold to the Brussels-based company MAD Africa for the amount of 700,000 euros. The company then sold them on to the Dutch Van Vliet transport company, who in their turn will transfer the aircraft to an as yet unspecified Abu Dhabi-based operator.

1990s
In January 1991, 18 Mirage 5 aircraft of the 3rd Tactical Wing were deployed to Turkey's Diyarbakır air base. During this operation, Belgian aircraft carried out several flights along the Iraqi border. After this operation the obsolete Mirage 5s were phased out.

On 15 July 1996, a C-130 with serial CH-06 carrying 37 members of the Dutch Army Fanfare Band and four Belgian crew members crashed at Eindhoven after a bird strike while executing a go-around, resulting in the loss of power to two engines. 34 passengers were killed, and only 7 survived. The accident is known in the Netherlands as the Herculesramp.

From October 1996, the Belgian Air Force cooperated with the Dutch Royal Air Force in the "Deployable Air Task Force" in patrolling former Yugoslavian airspace. F-16s of the 2nd and 10th Tactical Wings, operating from the Italian bases of Villafranca and Amendola, were assigned to missions insuring the control of a No-Fly Zone over Yugoslavia, and providing the air support necessary for UN and NATO troops. Between March 24 and June 10, 1999, twelve Belgian F-16s carried out 679 combat sorties – the first time since the second World War that Belgian aircraft took part in active war operations in enemy territory – against Serbia during the Kosovo crisis. The last Belgian F-16 detachment left Italy in August 2001.

2000s
On 29 March 2004, four F-16s from Kleine Brogel were transferred under NATO's Baltic Air Policing mission to the Šiauliai Air Base in Lithuania for three months, where they were employed in monitoring the Lithuanian, Latvian, and Estonian skies.

In 2005, the Helicopter Wing (WHeli – HeliW) deployed four A-109 (including one Medevac) in Tuzla, Bosnia. In July, four F-16s deployed to Afghanistan to support the NATO International Security Assistance Force. From June to October 2005, the 80th UAV Squadron deployed its B-Hunter in Tuzla.

In 2006, Belgian Hunter unmanned air vehicles deployed to the Democratic Republic of the Congo as part of the EU EUFOR peacekeeping mission. At the same time, the Helicopter Wing (WHeli – HeliW) deployed three A-109 (including 1 Medevac) in Mostar, Bosnia, in Operation Blue Bee.

On 1 December 2006 the Belgian Air Component deployed again under Baltic Air Policing mission four F-16 MLU aircraft to Šiauliai Air Base in Lithuania, to defend the airspace of Estonia, Latvia, and Lithuania.

From August 2008, four F-16s were deployed to Kandahar in Afghanistan in support of the Dutch land forces.

In March 2011, Belgium deployed six F-16 fighters to Araxos in Greece, in support of Operation Odyssey Dawn, to support the NATO operations over Libya. The aircraft were already at the base as part of a joint exercise and were transferred to NATO command. Up to June 2011, the aircraft had flown over 1,000 hours over Libya and attacked various military installations and targets.

2010/2020s
On 12 September 2011 a Wikileaks document showed a diplomatic cable from the American ambassador and the Minister of Defence Pieter De Crem that Belgium is interested in buying off-the-shelf Lockheed F-35 Lightnings by 2020.

In 2013 the Belgian Air Force supported French operations in Mali providing Medevac helicopter support with two A-109 helicopters and two C-130 Hercules in a tactical air transport role.

On 2 September 2013, four F-16 Fighting Falcon fighter-jets of the Royal Belgian Air Force landed at the Šiauliai Air Base to take charge of NATO's Air Policing mission over the Baltic states.

Between October 2014 and July 2015 six Lockheed Martin F-16AM Fighting Falcons were deployed under Operation Desert Falcon to Muwaffaq Salti Air Base as part of military intervention against the Islamic State of Iraq and the Levant.

On 11 October 2018 a Belgian Air Force F-16 caught fire during maintenance works at Florennes Air Base. The fire, reportedly caused by the accidental firing of a cannon, completely destroyed that aircraft. A second F-16 was also damaged.

On 25 October 2018, Belgium officially selected the offer for 34 F-35As to replace the current fleet of around 54 F-16s. In the accompanying news conference, government officials stated that the decision to select the F-35 over the Eurofighter Typhoon came down to the price, and later stated that "The offer from the Americans was the best in all our seven valuation criteria". The total purchasing price for the aircraft and its support until 2030 totaled €4 billion, €600 million cheaper than the initially budgeted €4.6 billion. First deliveries are scheduled to take place in 2023.

On 19 September 2019, a Belgian Air Force F-16 crashed in France.

In 2021 the STAR program (Strategic Defense Review) was announced by the Belgian Ministry of Defense which plans for the upgrade of the existing 4 NFH90 helicopters used by the Belgian Navy with sensors & weapons, the replacement of the Augusta A109 helicopters by a ~15 Light Utility Helicopter (EC145 is a candidate) and the acquisition of 4 heavy transport helicopters (CH47F is a candidate) to replace the 4 TTH90's whereby closer cooperation with the Netherlands Air Force is considered.In 2021 the STAR program (Strategic Defense Review)  was announced by the Belgian Ministry of Defense which plans for the upgrade of the existing 4 NFH90 helicopters used by the Belgian Navy with sensors & weapons, the replacement of the Augusta A109 helicopters by a ~15 Light Utility Helicopter (EC145 is a candidate) and the acquisition of 4 heavy transport helicopters (CH47F is a candidate) to replace the 4 TTH90's whereby closer cooperation with the Netherlands Air Force is considered

Joint air policing
On 4 March 2015, the Belgian and Dutch ministers of defence, along with the ambassador of Luxembourg to the Netherlands, signed an agreement on joint air policing. Starting mid-2017, the Belgian Air Component and the Royal Netherlands Air Force will take turns keeping two F-16s on quick reaction alert (QRA) defending the airspace of all three Benelux countries. The agreement could allow the Belgian minister of defence to order a Dutch aircraft to use lethal force over Belgian airspace, and vice versa. Luxembourg, while currently covered by Belgian QRA, does not allow the use of lethal force over its territory.

Organization 
The organization of the aircomponent as of 2018.The airforce has about 6,500 total active personnel divided in 10 operational units and an headquarters. In the near future, an air-artillery unit with long range surface to air missiles is to be established.

 HQ COMPOSAIR (headquarters of the airforce) in Evere
 1st wing (Helicopters and training aircraft) in Bevekom and Koksijde
 Meteo Wing (weather forecasting for the airforce) 
 Air traffic control centre in Steenokkerzeel
 Control and Reporting Centre in Bevekom
 Aviation Safety Directorate (in charge of aviation safety)
 Airforce Competence Centre (in charge of training flying and non-flying personnel) in Bevekom
 10th tactical wing 
 31st fighter squadron with F-16
 349th fighter squadron with F-16
 operations conversion unit
 operations squadron
 maintenance group
 defence and support group
 2nd tactical wing
 1st fighter squadron with F-16
 350th fighter squadron with F-16
 operations conversion unit
 operations squadron
 maintenance group
 defence and support group
 80th UAV squadron, to be equipped with 4 MQ-9 drones
 15th wing airtransport in Melsbroek with 8 A400M transport aircraft (7 Belgium & 1 Luxembourg) and 2 Dassault Falcon 20E jets

Aircraft

Current aircraft

 

NOTE: Belgium is participating in the NATO MRTT unit with the use of an Airbus A330 MRTT

Retired aircraft
Below is a list of some notable retired aircraft

Personnel

Officer ranks

Other ranks

Future 
In the strategic defence vision report of the Belgian government it was stated that the Belgian air component will invest in 34 new fighter aircraft being introduced into service 2025–2030 and contribute for one aerial refuelling aircraft (A330 MRTT) as part of the Multi National Tanker Transport squadron based at Eindhoven Airport, to be able to deploy the new fighter aircraft in a more independent fashion.

The Belgian government planned to purchase four large reconnaissance UAVs with the option to buy eight more which will be able to fly at great height. Their primary goal will be reconnaissance assignments but the option also exists to arm them.

Regarding the replacement of the aging F-16s there was some controversy within the Belgian government. The Flemish socialist party claimed that the government has already chosen the Lockheed Martin F-35 Lightning II, ignoring the Eurofighter Typhoon and Dassault Rafale, which were both also part of the tender, because it intended to purchase fighters of a "new generation", and the successor of the F-16s also needed the capability of carrying B61 nuclear warheads, which are supposedly stored at Kleine Brogel. Minister of Defence Steven Vandeput contradicted this and stated that no official choice would be made until 2018 and that all options were still on the table.

The Sea King helicopters were retired in March 2019 after 43 years of service. The Alpha Jet was also retired in December 2019 and sold to Top Aces in July 2020. Future pilot training is to be conducted in the US at the Euro-NATO Joint Jet Pilot Training (ENJJPT) program based at Sheppard Air Force Base in Texas. In addition, the three Alouette III helicopters flown for the Belgian Navy were phased out in 2021 after 50 years of operational service.

On 25 October 2018, Belgium officially selected the offer for 34 F-35As to replace the current fleet of around 53 F-16s. In the accompanied news conference, government officials stated that the decision to select the F-35 over the Eurofighter Typhoon came down to the price, and later stated that "The offer from the Americans was the best in all our seven valuation criteria". The total purchasing price for the aircraft and its support until 2030 totaled €4 billion, €600 million cheaper than the initially budgeted €4.6 billion. First deliveries are scheduled to take place in 2023.

In 2018 the Belgian Government approved the negotiations to acquire two General Atomics MQ-9B SkyGuardian MALE drones which are planned to be operational from 2023, replacing the IAI Hunter drones phased out since early 2021.

In 2018 two Hercules aircraft were retired. In 2019 and 2020 additional aircraft were retired prior to the transition to the Airbus A400M starting in 2020. The remaining Hercules will be phased out; two in 2021 and the last aircraft were withdrawn from Operational Service as per December 17. 2021 after 50 years for service to the Belgian Air Force.

Belgium contributes one Airbus A330 MRTT tanker aircraft as part of the NATO MRTT Squadron based at Eindhoven Air Base, replacing the leased Airbus 321 which was phased out in 2020 and returned to the lessor.

In June 2020, it was deemed that the NH90 was too expensive and too few in numbers to be operated effectively, plans are now to withdraw the 4 TTH-versions by 2024 and focus solely on the NFH's SAR and naval operations and acquire sensor & armament upgrades for the NFH-90. A possible replacement could be the Airbus H145M, up to 15 could be ordered to both replace the NH90-TTH and the remaining Agusta A109BAi's.

In January 2022, Minister of Defence announced that the helicopter fleet will be completely renewed. There are plans to buy 15 new light utility helicopters (LUH) and 8 to 10new heavy lift helicopters. The 4 NH90-TTH will be withdrawn and phased out.

List of obsolete weapons and equipment
 MIM-23 Hawk surface-to-air missile
 Nike Hercules surface-to-surface missile

See also
 List of Lockheed F-104 Starfighter operators

References

Bibliography

 
 
 Silvester, John. "Call to Arms: The Percival Sea Prince and Pembroke". Air Enthusiast, No. 55, Autumn 1994, pp. 56–61.

External links

Official website Belgian Air Force | DEFENSIE Uw toekomst. Onze missie.
Official website Belgian Ministry of Defense - News | Belgiandefencenews.be

 
Aviation in Belgium
Military units and formations established in 1909
1909 establishments in Belgium